T. Henry Clarkson (1877 – April 18, 1936) was a senior golf champion and billiards champion.

Biography
He was born in 1877 and attended Harvard University. In 1917 he was defeated by Eugene L. Milburn in billiards by a score of 400 to 357. After his career in billiards and golf he worked in real estate. He died on April 18, 1936 in Forest Hills, New York.

References

American male golfers
American pool players
Harvard University alumni
1877 births
1936 deaths